Yermunchino (Yarmunsa) is a rural locality (a selo) in Bishkurayevsky Selsoviet, Tuymazinsky District, Bashkortostan, Russia. The population was 3400 as of 2010. There are 6 streets.

Geography 
Yermunchino is located 43 km east of Tuymazy (the district's administrative centre) by road. Bishkurayevo is the nearest rural locality.

References 

Rural localities in Tuymazinsky District